The São João Baptista, was a Portuguese galleon built in the 16th century, around 1530, considered the biggest and most powerful warship in the world by Portuguese, Castillian, and Italian observers of the time.

History
The exact date of its construction is unknown; the oldest known references to the vessel mention the "great galleon São João" sailing in a convoy to Guinea, under the command of Duarte Coelho in 1532.

The oldest known estimates regarding its armament range from 80 to 200 guns, including a large chase gun. It was among the earliest recorded vessels to have gun ports with lids, which were opened to expose the cannon as a show of firepower.

In 1533, King John III pondered sending the great vessel to Goa, the capital of Portuguese India, so as to reinforce the firepower of Portuguese fleets that operated in the Indian Ocean against the galleys, dhows, and junks of Asia, but Duarte Coelho advised him against it.

Capture of Tunis

The São João most famously distinguished itself during the Conquest of Tunis (1535), when it bombarded La Goletta fortress.

Besides the São João itself, a further 20 war caravels and 2 carracks, bearing a total of 1500 men (of which 515 were soldiers and 230 were artillery gunners) made up the Portuguese expedition. The entire fleet carried 598 guns in total, most of them small caliber (1 basilisco, 2 leões, 3 águias, 19 camelos, 21 esperas, 52 pedreiros, 150 falcões, 350 berços). Its captain was António de Saldanha, with Infante Luís, Duke of Beja, brother of John III, and brother-in-law of Charles V being in overall command of the expeditionary corps, the galleon being his flagship.

Emperor Charles V visited the galleon personally, and marveled at its construction quality and armaments, while Andrea Doria also inspected the vessel on the occasion and regarded it favorably for its strength and orderliness.

Decommissioning

In 1550, the by then "old and very famous galleon São João was dispatched to Brazil", along with a convoy of several merchant ships with supplies, in the aid of the nascent colony and city of Salvador, and the following year, it was dismantled in Pernambuco, its iron parts and ammunition salvaged by the colonists, according to a report by governor Tomé de Sousa to King John III of Portugal.

Botafogo in Rio de Janeiro

One member of the crew named João de Sousa Pereira Botafogo, a nobleman from the city of Elvas, became famous because he was the master gunner responsible for the ship's artillery batteries, earning the nickname "botafogo" ("kindler"), which he later added to his family name. Later, he went to live in the Portuguese colony of Brazil, fighting against the French and the local Tupi Indians. As a reward, the Portuguese Crown granted him some lands known today as Botafogo.

See also
 Flor de la Mar
 Great Michael
 Mary Rose
 Peter Pomegranate
 Santa Anna (1522 ship)

Bibliography
Batalhas e Combates da Marinha Portuguesa, Vol. II, pages 243/245 – from Saturnino Monteiro. Livraria Sá da Costa, 1st edition, 1991.
Nobreza de Portugal e do Brasil – Vol. I, pages 382/384. Published by Zairol Lda., Lisbon 1989.
O Galeão S. João (c. 1530-1551). Dados para uma monografia, José Virgílio Pissarra, in Fernando Oliveira e o Seu Tempo - Humanismo e Arte de Navegar no Renascimento Europeu (1450-1650), Cascais 1999.

References

Naval ships of Portugal
Maritime history of Portugal
16th-century ships
Galleons
Age of Sail ships of Portugal
16th-century introductions
1551 disestablishments